The Asuncion Group is a geologic group in California. It preserves fossils dating back to the Cretaceous period.

See also

 List of fossiliferous stratigraphic units in California
 Paleontology in California

References
 

Geologic groups of California
Cretaceous System of North America